Four ships of the Royal Navy have borne the name HMS Rinaldo, derived from the mythical knight Renaud de Montauban:

 was a 10-gun  launched in 1808. She was converted to a packet brig in 1824 and was sold in 1835.
 was a  wooden screw sloop launched in 1860 and sold in 1884.
 was a  sloop launched in 1900 and sold in 1921.
 was an  launched in 1943 and broken up in 1961.

Royal Navy ship names